Carlia sexdentata, the six-toothed rainbow-skink, is a species of skink in the genus Carlia. It is endemic to Northern Territory and Queensland in Australia.

References

Carlia
Reptiles described in 1877
Endemic fauna of Australia
Skinks of Australia
Taxa named by William John Macleay